Elections in Punjab, a state in India are conducted in accordance with the Constitution of India. The Assembly of Punjab creates laws regarding the conduct of local body elections unilaterally while any changes by the state legislature to the conduct of state level elections need to be approved by the Parliament of India. In addition, the state legislature may be dismissed by the Parliament according to Article 356 of the Indian Constitution and President's rule may be imposed.

Political Parties

National Parties
 Bharatiya Janata Party
 Indian National Congress
 Bahujan Samaj Party
 Communist Party of India (Marxist)

State Parties
 Shiromani Akali Dal
 Aam Aadmi Party

Registered Unrecognized Parties
 Lok Insaaf Party
 Sanyukt Samaj Morcha

Lok Sabha elections

Vidhan Sabha Elections 

Pre-Independence

Post-Independence

 ^ - Party didn't contest election
 ~ - Party didn't exist
 - Green color box indicates the party/parties who formed the government

Next Punjab Legislative Assembly election is expected to be held in 2027.

See also
 Elections in Haryana, carved out of Punjab in 1966
 Elections in Himachal Pradesh, carved out of Punjab in 1966
 Elections in India, national elections

External links
Election Commission of India

 
History of Punjab, India (1947–present)